Piëch Automotive is an electric car manufacturer based in Zug, Switzerland, founded in August 2017 by Anton "Toni" Piëch and Rea Stark Rajcic.

History 
Anton Piëch, son of Ferdinand Piëch, former CEO of the Volkswagen Group and great-grandson of Ferdinand Porsche, founded the Swiss electric car manufacturer Piëch Automotive in 2017 with industrial designer Rea Stark Rajcic.

Piëch Automotive presented their first model, the GT Mark Zero (or Mk0), at the 2019 Geneva International Motor Show.

The particularity of Piëch Automotive's engineering is its modular concept, which makes it possible to keep software and hardware components up to date, in order to keep up with developments and technical progress, so the powertrain is interchangeable, while maintaining the structure and bodywork of the vehicle. The entire vehicle concept is designed and engineered for lean manufacturing with external partners without vertically integrating any production in the company.

Mark Zero concept 

The Piëch Mark Zero GT, whose first sketches date back to 2017, was presented as a concept car at the Geneva Motor Show on March 5, 2019.

Design 
The car is a two-seater sports coupé in the contemporary style. The first models should be delivered in 2022 equipped with electric motors and a battery positioned on the central tunnel as far as the rear axle, for a weight of 1,800 kg. The Mark Zero will be able to accommodate thermal, hybrid or fuel cell powertrains thanks to its modular platform, which is planned to be used for an SUV and a "Piëch sedan" in a second phase.

Motorization
The Mark Zero is equipped with three electric motors, a 150 kW asynchronous electric motor mounted on the front axle and two independent synchronous electric motors mounted on the rear axle of 150 kW each, providing a total power of 600 hp.

Piëch claims its innovative battery is 80% rechargeable in 4 min 40 s on a 380 kW fast terminal that has not yet been deployed in 2019, for a range of 500 km.

Reception
The design of the new car concept was mainly evaluated positively.
Klaus Schmidt for example, former sportscar developer of the BMW M GmbH, describes the design as unique.

Production
In September 2021 the Company began testing the Piëch GT4 and the car is expected to go into production mid 2024. The production version is expected to do zero to 60 mph in under three seconds, and 0 to 124 mph clocks less than nine seconds. Piëch says it's working with Chinese company TGOOD on a proprietary charger that can refill 80% of the battery in five minutes

References

External links 

 Official Website of Piëch Automotive

Car manufacturers of Switzerland
Battery electric vehicle manufacturers
Luxury motor vehicle manufacturers
Sports car manufacturers
Vehicle manufacturing companies established in 2017
Swiss brands
Electric vehicle manufacturers of Switzerland
Swiss companies established in 2017